Scan2CAD is a commercial raster-to-vector and vector-to-vector conversion and editing computer-aided design software application which is developed and maintained in the UK by Avia Systems.

History 

Scan2CAD's first version was released in April 1993. The publishing company was Softcover International. This company continued to publish the software until 2010 when Avia Systems acquired the software.

The development team has continued to be the same throughout the full lifetime of the software.

Scan2CAD is now used across the world by a very wide variety of users ranging from government and large industrial organisations to smaller individual firms. It has been translated to localised language versions including Polish, Italian, French and Japanese. The Scan2CAD software is recommended by leading imaging hardware companies such as HP, Canon and Fuji Xerox.

Code Names 

From version 10.0 Scan2CAD's major version releases use code names that reference great mathematicians.

It was described that these code names are intended to "take inspiration" from the stories of these mathematicians.

Supported file types 

Below lists all types of the file supported by Scan2CAD starting from version 8.

Raster file types: BMP, PCX, IMG, TIFF, CALS, JPEG, JPEG2K, GIF, PNG, CIT, PDF

Vector file types: DXF, DWG, SVG, HPGL, WMF, EMF, TXF, PDF (vector graphics)

Technologies used
A non-exhaustive list of the technologies used by Scan2CAD in the raster-to-vector and vector-to-vector conversion process.

External links
 
Official Scan2CAD YouTube channel

References

Computer-aided design software